Parliamentary elections were held in Norway between 2 and 25 October 1909, with a second round held between 18 October and 11 November. The result was a victory for the alliance of the Conservative Party and the Free-minded Liberal Party, which won 64 of the 123 seats in the Storting.

Results

Notes

References

General elections in Norway
1900s elections in Norway
Norway
Parliamentary
Norway
Norway